Thomas Christiansen Tarín (born 11 March 1973) is a Danish-Spanish former footballer who played as a striker, currently the head coach of Panama.

Left-footed, he played for a number of clubs in Danish, Spanish and German football over a 15-year professional career, being crowned the top goalscorer of the 2002–03 Bundesliga whilst with Bochum. Born in Denmark, he represented the Spain national team.

In 2013, Christiansen started working as a manager.

Playing career

Early years
Born in Hadsund in Denmark to a Spanish mother, Christiansen was raised in Copenhagen. He started playing football aged nine in Avedøre IF, then spent one year at Brøndby IF before moving on to Hvidovre IF.

Christiansen trained with the youth team of Real Madrid, but when his mother forbade him to join the club, he moved to Boldklubben af 1893. In May 1991 he scored six goals in a youth team match against Kjøbenhavns Boldklub, and went back to Spain to train with defending La Liga champions FC Barcelona.

Barcelona
Christiansen signed a four-year contract with Barcelona in July 1991, when Johan Cruyff was team manager, with a dream of playing alongside their Danish playmaker Michael Laudrup. He started competing as a senior with the reserves, where he soon was joined by compatriot Ronnie Ekelund; during this period, he was frequently called up to train with the main squad, but received almost no playing time due to stiff competition.

When he joined Barcelona, Christiansen agreed to a clause in his contract that stated he would be a Spanish citizen, and thereby not count towards the foreigner quota in the league. After becoming naturalised, he was called up for the under-21 team in December 1992, and scored a goal to help defeat Germany 2–1.

Still playing for Barcelona's B team, Christiansen was called up for the Spanish senior squad by manager Javier Clemente, in January 1993, making his debut against Mexico on the 27th and impressing in a game which featured few regulars for the European nation. He prolonged his link with the Catalans until 1997, and made his official debut for the club when he played the last seven minutes of the UEFA Super Cup final – first leg – away to SV Werder Bremen. He appeared in his first competitive match in a Copa del Rey contest against Atlético Madrid, and was once more selected to the national team, appearing as a substitute in a 1994 FIFA World Cup qualification match against Lithuania and scoring with a flick of the heel in an eventual 5–0 home win.

Without having played any league games for Barcelona, Christiansen was put on loan at fellow league club Sporting de Gijón, in February 1993. He was mostly injured during that stint, but managed four league goals, subsequently returning to the Camp Nou where he suffered another injury during pre-season; other loans followed, first at CA Osasuna then at Racing de Santander in the 1994–95 season, starting well enough at the latter to earn another call-up by Spain, only to pull out due to injury.

Mixed success
Spanish league regulations stated that following three years of loan contracts, Barcelona had to compensate Christiansen financially, if they declined any proposed transfer deal. He was first sold to English club Manchester City in October 1995, but wanted to stay in Spain, being instead transferred to Real Oviedo the next January for DKK 4.6 million. Following a good start, he failed to score any goals in his second year even though he appeared in 31 matches, and was sold to Segunda División's Villarreal CF in November 1997, helping them promote but managing to find the net only once the following campaign, which ended in relegation.

A proposed deal with a Mexican team never materialised, and Christiansen was without a club in 1999. He went on to play for Terrassa FC in the Spanish lower leagues, finishing that season at Panionios F.C. in Greece before returning to Denmark in August 2000, signing with defending Danish champions Herfølge BK, and showing good form when he scored two goals in a win over eventual runners-up Brøndby.

Breakthrough in Germany
In January 2001, Christiansen moved to Germany to play for VfL Bochum in the Bundesliga, being relegated to the second division (as with Herfølge) but contributing with 17 goals the following season, to be the North Rhine-Westphalia's team top scorer as they won promotion; he added 21 in next year's top flight, being crowned joint league top scorer with Giovane Élber of FC Bayern Munich.

Following that achievement, Christiansen was signed by Hannover 96 in June 2003 to replace Fredi Bobic. He scored nine times in his first year, but failed to reproduce his previous form mainly due to several injuries, including a knee operation and two shinbone ailments; in the summer of 2006, the club chose not to prolong his contract and he left, retiring shortly after at the age of 33.

International goal
Score and result list Spain's goal tally first, score column indicates score after Christiansen goal.

Coaching career

Early spells and AEK
Christiansen started his managerial career in the United Arab Emirates, as part of Luis Milla's coaching staff at Al Jazira Club, arriving in February 2013 and leaving in October as the latter was fired. In late April 2014 he was appointed head coach of AEK Larnaca FC in the Cypriot First Division, after having been approached for the job by former Barcelona B teammate Xavier Roca, who acted as director of football; in his first two seasons, he led them to consecutive best-ever runner-up league finishes.

Also during the 2015–16 campaign, Christiansen coached his team to the third qualifying round of the UEFA Europa League, losing 4–0 on aggregate to FC Girondins de Bordeaux.

APOEL
On 21 May 2016, after two successful seasons, Christiansen moved to reigning Cypriot champions APOEL FC, signing a one-year contract effective as of 1 June. On 2 August, they knocked out Rosenborg BK 4–1 on aggregate in the third qualifying round of the UEFA Champions League, being ousted the following round by F.C. Copenhagen and eventually reaching the last-16 stage in the Europa League for the first time in their history.

Christiansen won his first managerial title in 2017 after conquering the Cypriot League, losing only two games during the season and having the best defensive record with 27 clean sheets. He also reached the final of the domestic cup, lost 1–0 to Apollon Limassol; on 25 May a meeting between club and coach was held, and subsequently both decided to part ways.

Leeds United
On 15 June 2017, Christiansen was announced as the new head coach of Championship club Leeds United, after being appointed by new owner Andrea Radrizzani to replace Garry Monk, with the club announcing that they wanted "to appoint someone who can help us create a winning culture at the club and unite everyone connected with Leeds United, from the players to the supporters". Four days later, it was revealed that he would be joined by assistant Julio Bañuelos, fitness coach Iván Torres and goalkeeper coach Marcos Abad.

Christiansen was dismissed on 4 February 2018, after a poor run of results and with the team tenth in the table.

Union SG
On 1 July 2019, Christiansen was appointed at Belgian First Division B's Union SG. He was released in May 2020.

Panama
Christiansen was named new manager of the Panama national team on 23 July 2020, replacing Américo Gallego who was released amid a restructuring of the Panamanian Football Federation. His first games were friendlies away to neighbours Costa Rica on 10 and 13 October, both won by a single Abdiel Ayarza goal.

At the 2021 CONCACAF Gold Cup, Christiansen's team were eliminated from the group stage after failing to beat Qatar and Honduras. The 2022 FIFA World Cup qualification campaign was ended by a 5–1 defeat to the United States in Orlando in the penultimate fixture.

Managerial statistics

Honours

Player
Barcelona
UEFA Super Cup: 1992

Spain U21
UEFA European Under-21 Championship third place: 1994

Individual
Bundesliga top scorer: 2002–03 (shared with Giovane Élber)

Manager
APOEL
Cypriot First Division: 2016–17
Cypriot Cup runner-up: 2016–17

See also
List of Spain international footballers born outside Spain

References

External links

1973 births
Living people
People from Hadsund
Danish people of Spanish descent
Spanish people of Danish descent
Sportspeople from the North Jutland Region
Danish men's footballers
Spanish footballers
Association football forwards
Danish Superliga players
Avedøre IF players
Hvidovre IF players
Boldklubben af 1893 players
Herfølge Boldklub players
La Liga players
Segunda División players
Segunda División B players
FC Barcelona Atlètic players
FC Barcelona players
Sporting de Gijón players
CA Osasuna players
Racing de Santander players
Real Oviedo players
Villarreal CF players
Terrassa FC footballers
Super League Greece players
Panionios F.C. players
Bundesliga players
2. Bundesliga players
VfL Bochum players
Hannover 96 players
Spain under-21 international footballers
Spain international footballers
Spanish expatriate footballers
Expatriate footballers in Greece
Expatriate footballers in Germany
Danish expatriate sportspeople in Spain
Spanish expatriate sportspeople in Greece
Spanish expatriate sportspeople in Germany
Kicker-Torjägerkanone Award winners
Danish football managers
Spanish football managers
Cypriot First Division managers
AEK Larnaca FC managers
APOEL FC managers
English Football League managers
Leeds United F.C. managers
Belgian First Division B managers
Royale Union Saint-Gilloise managers
Panama national football team managers
2021 CONCACAF Gold Cup managers
Spanish expatriate football managers
Expatriate football managers in Cyprus
Expatriate football managers in England
Expatriate football managers in Belgium
Expatriate football managers in Panama
Spanish expatriate sportspeople in Cyprus
Spanish expatriate sportspeople in England
Spanish expatriate sportspeople in Belgium
Spanish expatriate sportspeople in Panama